This is a list of Christian monasteries and religious houses in France, both extant and non-extant, and for either men or women (or both).

Christian religious houses arranged by order

Augustinians
Chancelade Abbey, Chancelade, Dordogne
Fontenelles Abbey, Saint-André-d'Ornay, Vendée 
Paris:
Congregation of the Sacred Hearts of Mary and Jesus of the Perpetual Adoration (Congrégation des Sacrés Coeurs de Marie et de Jésus de l'Adoration Perpétuelle), Rue de Picpus, Paris, canonesses; formerly the Priory of the Canonesses of St. Augustine of the Victory of Lepanto. During the French Revolution the canonesses were expelled, and a certain Coignard took over the buildings as a nursing home for sick prisoners of the Terror: the Maison de Santé de Coignard. The gardens were used for the disposal of the bodies of the victims of the guillotine. After the revolution a community of canonesses was re-installed here, as a memorial to the many dead.
Abbey of St. Genevieve, Paris
Abbey of St. Victor, Paris
Sablonceaux Abbey, Sablonceaux, Charente-Maritime
Abbey of St. Jean des Vignes, Soissons
Abbey of St. Loup, Troyes

Benedictines
(including Cluniacs):
see List of Benedictine monasteries in France

Carmelites
Carmel de la Place Maubert

Carthusians
see List of Carthusian monasteries in France

Cistercians
(including Trappists):
see List of Cistercian monasteries in France

Dominicans
Convent of Sainte Marie de la Tourette (Couvent Sainte-Marie de La Tourette), friars (Éveux, Rhône)

Franciscans
Capuchin Friary, Crest (Monastère des Capucins de Crest) Capuchin friars, (Crest, Drôme)
Convent of Poor Clares, Gravelines

Premonstratensians
see List of Premonstratensian monasteries in France

References

See also
List of Carolingian monasteries
List of Imperial abbeys